Spandarmad may be:
the Middle Persian form of Spenta Armaiti, one of the Amesha Spenta or "Bounteous Immortals"
a month of the historical Zoroastrian calendar, see Zoroastrian month names
the Sepandārmazgān festival in Modern Iran